This is a list of members of the fifth legislative session of the Estonian Parliament (Riigikogu) following the 1932 elections (held on 21–23 May 1932). It sat between 15 June 1932 and 2 October 1934, when its activities were suspended. The session formally ended on 31 December 1937.

Officers 
Source:

Chairman 

 20.06.1932–19.07.1932: Karl Eenpalu
 19.07.1932–18.05.1933: Jaan Tõnisson
 18.05.1933–29.08.1934: Karl Eenpalu
 28.09.1934–31.12.1937: Rudolf Penno

First Assistant Chairman 

 20.06.1932–19.07.1932: Tõnis Kalbus
 19.07.1932–01.12.1933: Jaan Soots
 01.12.1933–28.09.1934: Rudolf Penno

Second Assistant Chairman 

 20.06.1932–04.10.1933: Mihkel Martna
 04.10.1933–02.10.1934: Karl Ast
 02.10.1934–31.12.1937: Leopold Johannes Johanson

Secretary 

 20.06.1932–31.12.1937: Jaagup Loosalu

First Assistant Secretary 

 20.06.1932–31.12.1937: August Tõllasepp

Second Assistant Secretary 

 20.06.1932–31.12.1937: Oskar Gustavson

List of members 
Source:

Ado Anderkopp
Nigol Andresen
Karl Ast
Karl August Baars
Adam Bachmann
Nikolai Bulin
Kaarel August Eenpalu
Bernhard Eilman
Rein Eliaser
Karl-August Frants
Karl Oskar Freiberg
Johan Fuks
Ivan Gorshkov
Aleksei Gretshanov
 Served until 24.03.1936; replaced by Egor Mazantsev
August Gustavson
 Joined on 25.05.1934, replacing Josep Rukki
 Served until 21.06.1934; replaced by Johannes Kraan
Oskar Gustavson
Mihkel Hansen
Johannes Hiob
 Joined on 03.07.1934, replacing Johannes Kraan
 Died in office on 27 September 1937; succeeded by Arnold Lainevool
Johan Holberg
Jaan Hünerson
Johannes Jaanis
Leopold Johannes Johanson
Erich Jonas
Mihkel Juhkam
 Joined on 20.06.1932, replacing Otto August Strandman
Aleksander Jõeäär
August Jürima
Juhan Kaarlimäe
Tõnis Kalbus
Aleksander Leon Richard Kapp
 Joined on 27.09.1934, replacing Johan Sihver
Alo Karineel
Oskar Kask
August Kerem
Hermann Georg Willibald Koch
Konstantin Konik
 Died in office on 03.08.1936; succeeded by Jakob Sõnajalg
Jakob Koppas
Johannes Kraan
 Joined on 21.06.1934, replacing August Gustavson
 Served until 03.07.1934; succeeded by Johannes Hiob
Priidik Kroos
 Served until 01.03.1934; succeeded by Aleksander Välison
Hugo Villi Kukke
Rudolf-Aleksander Kuris
 Served until 13.07.1933; succeeded by Helmut Maandi
Aleksander Kärner
Oskar Köster
Roman Laes
Arnold-Eduard Lainevool
 Joined on 27.09.1937, replacing Johannes Hiob
Jaan Lattik
August Laur
Stepan Leidtorp
 Joined on 25.01.1935, replacing Hans Martinson
August Julius Leps
Efim Liivik
Jaagup Loosalu
Gustav-Eduard Lorenz
Villem Maaker
Helmut Maandi
 Joined on 13.07.1933, replacing Rudolf-Aleksander Kuris
Hans Martinson
 Died in office on 25 January 1935; succeeded by Stepan Leidtorp
Märt Martinson
Mihkel Martna
 Died in office on 23.05.1934; succeeded by Josep Rukki
Jaan Masing
Egor Mazantsev
 Joined on 24.03.1936, replacing Aleksei Gretshanov
Aleksander Mekkart
 Joined on 18.07.1932, replacing Peeter Treiberg
Mihkel Mihkelson
Jaan Mõttus
Aleksander Oinas
Aleksander Ossipov
Jüri Ottas
Rudolf Penno
Johannes Perens
Eduard Pesur
Jaan Piiskar
Otto Pukk
Mihkel Pung
Konstantin Päts
August Rattas
Aleksander Leopold Raudkepp
August Rei
Marie Reisik
Vladimir Rooberg
Josep Rukki
 Joined on 23.05.1934, replacing Mihkel Martna.
 Served until 25.05.1934; succeeded by August Gustavson.
August Johannes Salum
Carl Schilling
Peeter Schütz
Johan Sihver
 Served until 27.09.1934; succeeded by Aleksander Leon Richard Kapp
Johannes Sikkar
Aleksander Silverstov
August Sirro
Karl-Johannes Soonberg
Jüri Mihkel Soontak
Jaan Soots
Aleksei Sorokin
 Died in office on 01.04.1933; succeeded by Feodor Veiss
Julie Steinmann
Aleksander Sternfeld
Otto August Strandman
 Served until 20.06.1932; succeeded by Mihkel Juhkam
Albert Suurkivi
Oskar Albert Suursööt
Jakob Sõnajalg
 Joined on 03.08.1936, replacing Konstantin Konik
Aleksander Sõster
Johannes-Friedrich Zimmermann
Theodor Tallmeister
Karl Tamm
Johannes Tammsoo
Jaan Teemant
Otto Tief
August Tobro
Kustas Tonkmann
Peeter Treiberg
 Served until 18.07.1932; succeeded by Aleksander Mekkart
Artur Tupits
August Tõllasepp
Jaan Tõnisson
Maksim Unt
August Usai
August Vann
Feodor Veiss
 Joined on 01.04.1933, replacing Aleksei Sorokin
Mathias Westerblom
 Joined on 20.06.1932, replacing Wilhelm von Wrangell
 Jüri Voiman
Wilhelm von Wrangell
 Served until 20.06.1932; succeeded by Mathias Vesterblom
Richard Vreeman
Aleksander Välison
 Joined on 01.03.1934, replacing Priidik Kroos

References 

5th